NH 152 may refer to:

 National Highway 152 (India)
 New Hampshire Route 152, United States